David O'Sullivan (Orlando, Florida, US) is an American ten-pin bowler and was the 2007 U.S. Amateur champion. O'Sullivan earned the title at the 2007 USBC Team USA Trials in January, 2007, which also put him on Team USA for the first time. As a member of Team USA, he won medals in five of six events at the Men's American Zone Championships contested in Guatemala in May, 2007.

O'Sullivan made the quarterfinals of the 2007 World Ranking Masters, losing to eventual tournament winner Stuart Williams of England.

O’Sullivan has a career best ranking 3rd in the world in spades.

References

American ten-pin bowling players
Year of birth missing (living people)
Living people